Swe may refer to
SWE (disambiguation)
Swe (name)
Swe-Danes, Danish-Swedish jazz and entertainment trio 
Swe Fly, a Swedish airline 
SwePol, a high-voltage submarine cable between Sweden and Poland